The 1988 Northern California Open singles was a tennis competition, part of the 1988 Northern California Open organised by the Women's Tennis Association. It was played on outdoor hard courts in Aptos, California in the United States and was part of Tier V of the 1988 WTA Tour. The tournament ran from July 25 through July 31, 1988.

Elly Hakami was the defending champion, but lost in the first round to Jennifer Santrock.

Sara Gomer won in the final 6–4, 7–5 against Robin White.

Seeds
A champion seed is indicated in bold text while text in italics indicates the round in which that seed was eliminated.

  Patty Fendick (semifinals)
  Stephanie Rehe (semifinals)
  Elly Hakami (first round)
  Robin White (final)
  Gretchen Magers (quarterfinals)
  Anne White (quarterfinals)
  Sara Gomer (champion)
  Jo Durie (quarterfinals)

Draw

References

 1988 Northern California Open Draw

Northern California Open (tennis)
1988 WTA Tour